The caret is a V-shaped grapheme, usually inverted and sometimes extended, used in proofreading and typography to indicate that additional material needs to be inserted at the point indicated in the text. The same symbol is also used as a diacritical mark modifying another character (as in ), for which purpose it is known as a circumflex.

Usage
The caret was originally and continues to be used in handwritten form as a proofreading mark to indicate where a punctuation mark, word, or phrase should be inserted into a document. The caret symbol can be written just below the line of text for a punctuation mark at low line position, such as a comma, or just above the line of text as an inverted caret for a character at a higher line position, such as an apostrophe, or in either position to indicate insertion of a letter, word or phrase; the material to be inserted may be placed inside the caret, in the margin, or above the line.

References

Typographical symbols
Copy editing